Wheeler Springs may refer to:
Wheeler Springs, California, an unincorporated community in Ventura County, California
Wheeler Springs, Texas, an unincorporated community in Houston County, Texas